The AFF U-19 Women's Championship is association football tournament for women's national teams under the age of 19. It is organised by the ASEAN Football Federation every two years. The official tournament started in 2014, hosted by Thailand and won by Thailand.

History

2014
The first women's ASEAN championship at the youth level, held as the 2014 AFF U-19 Women's Championship was held in Thailand from 16 August through 26 August 2014. The competition was held at the Rajamangala Stadium.

In the final, Thailand defeated Vietnam by penalties. The top scorer award went to Nilar Win of Myanmar.

2022
Eight years after the maiden tournament, ASEAN Football Federation decided to bring back the competition and changed it into an under-18 tournament. Indonesia were chosen as host for the 2022 edition. All matches were held in Jakabaring Sport City, with Gelora Sriwijaya Stadium as the main venue and Jakabaring Athletic Field as the alternate venue.

Results

Awards

Winning coaches

Records and statistics

Total wins

Participating nations 

Legend

  — Champions
  — Runners-up
  — Third place
  — Fourth place

 GS — Group stage
 q — Qualified for the current tournament
  — Did not enter / Withdrew / Banned
  — Hosts

General statistics
As per statistical convention in football, matches decided in extra time are counted as wins and losses, while matches decided by penalty shoot-outs are counted as draws. 3 points per win, 1 point per draw and 0 points per loss.

As end of 2022 AFF U-19 Women's Championship

Top scorers of all time

See also 
 AFF Women's Championship
 AFF U-16 Women's Championship

References

External links 
 at the ASEAN Football Federation

 
AFF competitions
Under-19 association football competitions
2014 establishments in Southeast Asia
Women's association football competitions in Asia